Mesud Pezer (born 27 August 1994) is a Bosnian shot putter. Pezer holds both national records in the shot put discipline.

He represented his country at the 2016 Summer Olympics without qualifying for the final, and the 2020 Summer Olympics, where he reached the final and placed 11th overall.

His personal bests in the event are  outdoors (Växjö 2019) and  indoors (Birmingham 2018).

International competitions

Note: This table only includes major athletics championships and does not include Diamond League or World Athletics Continental Tour/IAAF World Challenge meets.

References

1994 births
Living people
Bosnia and Herzegovina male shot putters
Athletes (track and field) at the 2016 Summer Olympics
Olympic athletes of Bosnia and Herzegovina
Mediterranean Games bronze medalists for Bosnia and Herzegovina
Athletes (track and field) at the 2018 Mediterranean Games
World Athletics Championships athletes for Bosnia and Herzegovina
Mediterranean Games medalists in athletics
Sportspeople from Zenica
Athletes (track and field) at the 2020 Summer Olympics